In enzymology, a tubulin—tyrosine ligase is an enzyme that catalyzes the chemical reaction

ATP + detyrosinated α-tubulin + L-tyrosine  α-tubulin + ADP + phosphate

The 3 substrates of this enzyme are ATP, detyrosinated alpha-tubulin, and L-tyrosine, whereas its 3 products are alpha-tubulin, ADP, and phosphate.

This enzyme belongs to the family of ligases, specifically those forming carbon-nitrogen bonds as acid-D-amino-acid ligases (peptide synthases).  The systematic name of this enzyme class is alpha-tubulin:L-tyrosine ligase (ADP-forming).

References

 
 

EC 6.3.2
Enzymes of unknown structure